14 Message: Every Ballad Songs 2 is the fourth best of album of the Japanese pop group Every Little Thing, released on February 14, 2007.

Track listing

Notes
 co-arranged by Every Little Thing
 co-arranged by Ichiro Ito

Charts

External links
 14 Message: Every Ballad Songs 2 information at Avex Network.
 14 Message: Every Ballad Songs 2 information at Oricon.

Every Little Thing (band) compilation albums
2007 greatest hits albums
Avex Group compilation albums
Japanese-language compilation albums